Be Runway is the third extended play by British singer and rapper Bree Runway, released on 16 August 2019 through Virgin EMI Records. It is her first extended play released under a major label and features a guest appearance from Brooke Candy. Singles "2ON" and "Big Racks" featuring Brooke Candy were previously released in anticipation for the EP.

Background and promotion 
"2ON" served as the lead single and was released on 24 May 2019 alongside its music video. Runway explained the meaning of the song on a Twitter post released the same day as the song. She stated "Every day we are told that we could be better, prettier, brighter – as if there’s something wrong with us in the first place? When I was younger, I couldn’t hack the amount of shade thrown at my skin tone from the playgrounds, to the boys at the bus stops after school that were equally as black to every TV show, every music video, every movie that insinuated MY black was not beautiful!”. The song would be featured on Paper Magazine's Top 50 Songs of 2019 List. "Big Racks" featuring American rapper Brooke Candy was released as the second single from the album on 5 July. The accompanying music video would receive praise for its inclusion of touching upon racial discrimination in the workplace. On 2 August Bree Runway announced the EP's release date as well as the cover art and tracklist. The EP was released on 16 August 2019. A music video for "All Night" was released on 21 August.

Artwork 
In an interview, Bree discussed the artwork for the EP stating, "(the) cover is half white and half black and that in itself is a message. I want you to be free and be yourself. The darker side of it (represents) the lengths people will go to become lighter and also to become more acceptable socially and in our workplaces. For the EP, I looked at the lengths we would go to damage ourselves because of society".

Track listing

Credits and personnel 
Credits adapted from Tidal and organized in alphabetical order by surname.

 Johannes Burger - songwriting 
 Brooke Candy - featured artist , additional vocals 
 Levi Gordon - songwriting 
 Max Grahn - songwriting 
 Fat Max Gsus - production, songwriting 
 Michael Ilbert - mixing 
 Kilian & Jo - production 
 Dave Kutch - mastering 
 Imani McFarlane - additional vocals 
 Todd Oliver-Fisherman - guitar 
 Will Reeves - mixing 
 Raf Riley - mixing , associated performer 
 Bree Runway - lead vocals,  songwriting 
 Kilian Wilke - songwriting 
 Moon Willis - production , songwriting 
 808Charmer - production , songwriting

Release history

References 

2019 EPs
Hip hop EPs
Virgin EMI Records albums